A V5 engine is a five-cylinder piston engine where the cylinders share a common crankshaft and are arranged in a V configuration.

V5 engine designs are very uncommon, with the only production version of one being the 1997–2006 Volkswagen Group VR5 engine.

Automobiles

General Motors 
In the early 1980s, Oldsmobile developed a prototype  V5 diesel engine, however it never reached production stages and the project was subsequently abandoned. The engine is based on the Oldsmobile V6 diesel engine with the fuel injection pump in the location of the "missing" sixth cylinder. A prototype engine is on display at the RE Olds Museum in Lansing, Michigan.

Volkswagen Group 

The only V5 automobile engine to reach production was the  "VR5" engine manufactured by Volkswagen from 1997 to 2006. Based on Volkswagen's VR6 engine, the VR5 was a narrow-angle engine with staggered cylinders (three cylinders on one bank and two on the other) sharing a single cylinder head. As per the VR6 engine, the angle between the banks was 15 degrees. Initial versions used 2 valves per cylinder, however, an update in 2000 resulted in a total of 4 valves per cylinder and the addition of variable valve timing.

Motorcycles

Honda 
The Honda RC211V, a MotoGP racing motorcycle which competed in the 2002–2006 seasons, used a V5 engine. The transversely-mounted  engine had three cylinders at the front, two cylinders at the rear and a V-angle of 75.5 degrees. The engine used 4 valves per cylinder.

See also 
 Straight-five engine

References

 
5